Qeshlaq-e Yuseflu (also Romanized as Qeshlāq-e Yūseflū; also known as Chākherlū and Chākheyrlū) is a village in Garamduz Rural District, Garamduz District, Khoda Afarin County, East Azerbaijan Province, Iran. At the 2006 census, its population was 56, in 10 families.

References 

Populated places in Khoda Afarin County